Luis Paulo Supi (born 10 October 1996) is a Brazilian chess player holding the title of Grandmaster.

Career 
Born in Catanduva, São Paulo, Supi was awarded the FIDE titles of FIDE Master (FM) and International Master (IM) in 2013 and Grandmaster (GM) in 2018.

In an online blitz tournament hosted by the Internet Chess Club in May 2015, American Grandmaster Hikaru Nakamura accused Supi of cheating (Supi had defeated Nakamura). The tournament judges accepted Nakamura's accusation, reverted the match's result, and banned Supi from the tournament. Brazilian Grandmaster Rafael Leitão wrote in his personal website, "Accusing him of using an engine in this match is absurd. The match is full of tactical mistakes. Nakamura played extremely poorly and, honestly, wouldn't have survived long against any engine given his terrible opening.".

He won the Pan American Junior Championship in 2016 on tiebreak from Kevin Joel Cori Quispe of Peru. Both players had scored 8 points.

In April 2018, he was awarded the title of Grandmaster (GM). He represented Brazil in the 2018 Chess Olympiad, finishing with a score of 6½/10 (+5-2=3) on board three.

In an online blitz game played in May 2020, Supi defeated Magnus Carlsen in 18 moves after sacrificing his own Queen. The game became popular on social media, as Carlsen broadcast it live and was left surprised by the last move. In April 2021, Chess.com awarded that game the first spot in their Chess.com Immortal Game Contest.

On 4 November 2021, he became Brazilian Chess Champion (87th Brazilian Absolute Chess Championship).

FIDE ratings

References

External links 
 
 
 

1996 births
Living people
Brazilian chess players
Chess grandmasters
People from Catanduva